Tenrhynea is a genus of Southern African plants in the tribe Gnaphalieae within the family Asteraceae.

Species
The only known species is Tenrhynea phylicifolia, found in Eastern Cape, KwaZulu-Natal, Limpopo, Mpumalanga, and Eswatini

References

Gnaphalieae
Flora of Southern Africa
Monotypic Asteraceae genera